"Betcha by Golly, Wow" is a song written by Thom Bell and Linda Creed, originally titled "Keep Growing Strong" and recorded by Connie Stevens under the Bell label in 1970. Stevens' recording runs two minutes and thirty seconds. The composition later became a hit when it was released by the Philadelphia soul group the Stylistics in 1972 under its better known title, "Betcha by Golly, Wow".

The Stylistics version
One year after Stevens' original version was released, the Stylistics recorded a more successful cover version as an R&B ballad under the name the song is best known, "Betcha by Golly, Wow". It was the third track from the Stylistics' 1971 debut self-titled album; released as a single in 1972, it reached No. 3 on the Billboard Hot 100 chart. Billboard ranked it as the No. 18 song for 1972. It also climbed to No. 2 on the Billboard R&B chart,  and reached No. 13 on the UK Singles Chart in July 1972. The single sold over one million copies globally, earning the band a gold disc The award was presented by the RIAA on April 17, 1972. It was the band's second gold disc. There are two mixes of the song; the 3:17 version released as a single is the one most familiar to listeners, while the 3:48 album version has an instrumental break prior to the song's finale.

Charts

Weekly charts

Year-end charts

Prince version

Another version of "Betcha by Golly, Wow!" was released by American musician Prince (his stage name at that time being a symbol with no known pronunciation, see cover art) on his 20th album, Emancipation (1996). Prince had stated that he always wanted to release his own version but his record company, Warner Bros. Records, had not permitted it. The CD single was released in two formats in the UK, one with a picture sleeve and one with an orange cardboard sleeve that included a picture disc and a mini-poster. The song was also issued on cassette. All versions of the single had "Right Back Here in My Arms" as the B-side. Both tracks were the album versions. The track was released as a promotional single in the US; a music video was also produced.

The song was released on Mayte Garcia's (Prince's then-wife) 23rd birthday. Garcia also appeared in the video; she played herself in the doctor's office, confirming she is pregnant and revealing this to Prince when he walks into the room. One of the backgrounds of the video is Prince's own Paisley Park Studios. It charted fairly well in the US, based on airplay figures (in the US promotional singles were not allowed to chart until late 1998) and almost made the top 10 of the UK Singles Chart.

Critical reception
Billboard stated, "He follows the blueprint of the Stylistics' original recording almost to the letter, offering only the scant and fleeting hints of the offbeat brilliance on which he has built his career. That said, this is certainly a pleasant and hit-worthy effort, thanks in large part to a sweetly romantic falsetto vocal and the warm familiarity of the song." A reviewer from Music Week rated the song four out of five, adding, "This smoothly-produced debut for The Artist's new label is a sleek and seamless cover of the Stylistics' seventies hit. A hit no doubt, but not one of his classics."

Charts

References

External links 
 

1970 songs
1972 singles
Connie Stevens songs
The Stylistics songs
Songs written by Linda Creed
Songs written by Thom Bell
1996 singles
Prince (musician) songs
Music videos directed by Prince (musician)
NPG Records singles
EMI Records singles
Avco Records singles
Phyllis Hyman songs
Soul ballads
1970s ballads